Edward Jackman (28 June 1866 – 4 December 1956) was a Barbadian cricketer. He played in seven first-class matches for the Barbados cricket team from 1887 to 1898.

See also
 List of Barbadian representative cricketers

References

External links
 

1866 births
1956 deaths
Barbadian cricketers
Barbados cricketers
People from Saint Michael, Barbados